UMP-CMP kinase is an enzyme that in humans is encoded by the CMPK1 gene.

Function 

Uridine monophosphate (UMP)/cytidine monophosphate (CMP) kinase (EC 2.7.4.4) catalyzes the phosphoryl transfer from ATP to UMP, CMP, and deoxy-CMP (dCMP), resulting in the formation of ADP and the corresponding nucleoside diphosphate. These nucleoside diphosphates are required for cellular nucleic acid synthesis.

References

External links

Further reading

 
 
 
 
 
 
 
 
 
 
 
 
 
 

Genes on human chromosome 1